The Association of Junior Leagues International, Inc. (Junior League or JL) is a private, nonprofit educational women's volunteer organization aimed at improving communities and the social, cultural, and political fabric of civil society.  With 295 Junior League chapters in the United States, Canada, Mexico, and the United Kingdom, it is one of the oldest and largest of   Members engage in developing civic leadership skills, fundraising, and volunteering on JL committees to support partner community organizations related to foster children, domestic violence, human trafficking, illiteracy, city beautification, and other issues. Its mission is to advance women's leadership through meaningful community impact through volunteer action, collaboration, and training.

It was founded in 1901 in New York City by Barnard College debutante Mary Harriman Rumsey.

History

The first Junior League was founded in 1901 in New York City as the Junior League for the Promotion of the Settlement Movement. It is now known as the New York Junior League (NYJL). Its founder was then 19-year-old Barnard College student and debutante Mary Harriman Rumsey, sister of future Governor of New York W. Averell Harriman and daughter of railroad executive Edward H. Harriman.

Inspired by a lecture on settlement movements that chronicled the works of social reformers such as Lillian Wald and Jane Addams, Harriman Rumsey organized others to become involved in settlement work. The organization's first project was working at the College Settlement on Rivington Street on Manhattan's Lower East Side. Eleanor Roosevelt was an early member of the NYJL, joining in 1903 when she was 19 years old.

For many years the NYJL's clubhouse was located at 221 East 71st Street in Manhattan. Designed by architect John Russell Pope and opened in 1929, the building contained a swimming pool on the top floor, bedrooms for volunteers, a ballroom, a hairdressing salon, and a shelter for up to 20 abandoned babies. Marymount Manhattan College currently owns the building. In 1950 the NYJL clubhouse moved to the former Vincent Astor townhouse (Astor House) at 130 East 80th Street, where it remains as of 2020.

The New York Junior League was soon emulated: by 1921, thirty Leagues joined to form the national association. In 1921—after serving as New York City's Junior League president from 1907 to 1910—Dorothy Payne Whitney became the first president of the Association of Junior Leagues International Inc., operating as the umbrella organization for all Junior Leagues worldwide.

In 1961, the Junior League of Chicago co-founded the Art Institute's volunteer Docent Program to revitalize and expand "programming for children."

Women's organization
The League is an all-women organization. In 1996, the Los Angeles Times, The Washington Post, Chicago Tribune, and San Francisco Gate publicized that a male hairdresser named Clark Clementsen tried to join the League after his "high society clients" recommended him, but was denied membership and retained an attorney to argue his case at a meeting of AJLI representatives in NYC. For him, members had "been trained to be organized, articulate community leaders, and it showed...no men's organization even came close."

Development

Mission
"The Association of Junior Leagues International, Inc. (AJLI) is an organization of women committed to promoting voluntarism, developing the potential of women and improving communities through the effective action and leadership of trained volunteers. Its purpose is exclusively educational and charitable."

Chartered Leagues
As of 2019 there are 291 Leagues of 140,000 women in the United States, Canada, Mexico, and the UK, including but not limited to:

California
 Junior League of San Francisco

Canada
 Junior League of Montreal—the first League outside of the U.S.
 Junior League of Toronto
 Junior League of Hamilton-Burlington

Florida
 Junior League of Jacksonville
 Junior League of Orlando
 Junior League of Manatee County
 Junior League of Miami
 Junior League of Sarasota
 Junior League of Tampa

Massachusetts
 Junior League of Boston Inc.
 Junior League of Greater Springfield

Mississippi
 Junior League of Jackson—featured in The Help book and film

New York
 Junior League of Buffalo
 New York Junior League—the first league
 Junior League of Kingston
 Junior League of Long Island

North Carolina
 Junior League of Raleigh
 Junior League of Greensboro
 Junior League of Winston-Salem 
 Junior League of Charlotte
 Junior League of Durham and Orange Counties

Ohio
 Junior League of Akron
 Junior League of Cleveland
 Junior League of Cincinnati
 Junior League of Columbus
 Junior League of Dayton
 Junior League of Toledo

Utah 
 Junior League of Salt Lake City

Washington
 Junior League of Lower Columbia
 Junior League of Olympia
 Junior League of Seattle
 Junior League of Spokane
 Junior League of Tacoma

Wisconsin
 Junior League of Eau Claire
 Junior League of Madison
 Junior League of Milwaukee
 Junior League of Racine

UK
 Junior League of London

Membership

Prospective
Prospects must attend orientation at their chapter's clubhouse before applying for membership. The application requires biographical data, two short essay questions, two recommendation letters (in most chapters, with some chapters requiring the letters be written by members), and a $100 application fee (fees vary by league).

Provisional
Once admitted, candidates must register for the ~$150 provisional course (fees vary by league) where they are trained on the organization's history and professional volunteerism over four clubhouse meetings, an off-site group trivia session (JL 101), a group community project (oftentimes PIP aka "Playground Improvement Project"), a volunteer credit shift, a personal development session (VET aka "Volunteer Education Training"), a committee overview event (placement previews), and optional social events with their group of 15-20 women out of 150 total new class members each fall and spring semester. Those who don't complete graduation requirements by the end of the semester must start over the next semester.

Active
Following graduation from provisional course training, members pay annual dues of approximately $525+ (fees vary by league) to become Active members and participate in the annual placement process to serve on a committee for the next academic year under the following areas as unpaid volunteers: 
Communities (volunteering with partner community organizations)
Fundraising (event planning)
Membership Development
Communications (marketing and PR)

They're required to attend at least 75% or more of committee meetings and one personal development session (included in membership) each year. Fundraising events are optional for members not on the fundraising committee, with discounted tickets available to members. They can renew their committee placement annually with some restrictions, change committees, and/or run for committee, council, board, organization, and/or headquarters leadership. Those who don't complete their annual membership requirements have their membership revoked.

Sustainer and Sustainer Emeritus
Requirements for Active and Sustainer status vary by League, but after 20 years of membership or reaching a certain age, members achieve Sustainer status, followed by an option of Sustainer Emeritus status for members aged 80 years or older.

Fundraisers and advocacy
The Junior League has a full calendar year of members-only, family-friendly, and public events at their clubhouses and local venues such as hotels. Notable JL events raising money for partner community organizations related to foster children, domestic violence, human trafficking, illiteracy, city beautification, and other issues include, but are not limited to:

Annual Winter Ball—the Junior League's largest fundraiser since 1952, where League awards are given to honor outstanding members and a public figure, such as Mary J. Blige (2011). Non-member dinner tickets start at $500+.
Annual Thanksgiving Eve Ball—introducing debutantes to society at The Plaza and Waldorf-Astoria since 1948
Savor the Spring Restaurant Week
Spring House Tour
Team JL at the New York City Marathon

The New York Junior League used to have a thrift shop where proceeds went to the community organizations.

Other JL initiatives include its contributions to the passage of the Clean Water Act, free school lunch campaign, “Don’t Wait to Vaccinate” campaign, and The Junior Leagues’ Kids in the Kitchen initiative, which combats childhood obesity and educates families on health and nutrition.

Notable League members and alums

As of 2020, five first ladies of the U.S. have been Junior League members.

Politics
 Ann Bedsole—first female Alabama State Senator (1983–1995)
 Margot Birmingham—wife of 1992 / 1996 Presidential Candidate and businessman, Ross Perot
 Florence Bird—Canadian Senator appointed by Pierre Trudeau, broadcaster, and journalist
 Pam Bondi—Attorney General of Florida
 Barbara Bush—41st First Lady during George H. W. Bush administration
 Laura Bush—43rd First Lady during George W. Bush administration
 Pat Evans—three-term Mayor of Plano, Texas (2002-2009)
 Betty Ford—38th First Lady during Gerald Ford administration
 Judith Giuliani (née Nathan)—wife of 107th Mayor of New York City, Rudolph Giuliani
 Margaret Hance—first female Mayor of Phoenix, Arizona
 Glenda Hood—first female Mayor of Orlando, Florida (1992–2003)
 Margaret McTavish Konantz—Canadian Parliament, first woman elected to Canadian House of Commons from Manitoba
 Mary Pillsbury Lord—UN Delegate
 Stephanie Malone—Arkansas House of Representatives member (2009–present)
 Carolyn Maloney—U.S. Congresswoman from New York (2013–present)
 Doris Matsui—U.S. Congresswoman from California (2005–present)
 Geanie Morrison—Texas House of Representatives member (1999–present)
 Willie Landry Mount—Louisiana State Senator (2000-2012), first female Mayor of Lake Charles, Louisiana
 Sandra Day O'Connor—Associate Justice of the U.S. Supreme Court (1981-2006) appointed by Ronald Reagan
 Diane Patrick—Texas House of Representatives member
 Nancy Reagan—40th First Lady during Ronald Reagan administration
 Eleanor Roosevelt—32nd First Lady during Franklin D. Roosevelt administration, United Nations Delegate
 Margaret Chase Smith—first female U.S. Senator and first to serve in both houses
 Bobbie Sparrow—Canadian politician, House of Commons
 Carole Keeton Strayhorn—first female Mayor of Austin, Texas (1977–1983)

Business
 Martha Rivers Ingram—chairman of Ingram Industries after the death of her husband, E. Bronson Ingram II, and philanthropist

Entertainment, media, literature, and fashion
 Julia Child—TV chef and author of Mastering the Art of French Cooking
 Ruth Draper—actress
 Margaret Hamilton—actress, best known for her portrayal of the Wicked Witch of the West in The Wizard of Oz
 Katharine Hepburn—actress
 Ethma Odum—pioneer woman television personality in Alexandria, Louisiana 
 Suzanne Perron—fashion designer
 Mena Webb—writer and editor
 Eudora Welty—Pulitzer Prize winning author
 Shirley Temple—actress, UN Delegate, US Ambassador

Military and government
 Jeannie Deakyne—Army Officer and Bronze Star Medal recipient
 Cornelia Fort—first female pilot in American history to die on active duty
 Oveta Culp Hobby—first secretary of the Department of Health, Education and Welfare, first commanding officer of the Women's Army Corps
 Deborah Taylor Tate—FCC Commissioner

Nonprofit and philanthropy
 Mary Harriman—founder of the Junior League, sister of 48th Governor of New York, W. Averell Harriman
 Dorothy Payne Whitney—Whitney family member, philanthropist, NYJL President, and first AJLI President
 Helenka Adamowska Pantaleoni—U.S. Fund for UNICEF Co-founder and President (1953-1978)

Sports
 Sarah Palfrey Cooke—two-time Wimbledon champion
 Kerri Strug—Olympic Gold medalist in gymnastics, White House correspondent

In popular culture
 Five and Ten (1931 film) Marion Davies is shown volunteering at a Junior League Charity Bazaar.
 The Official Preppy Handbook—1980 tongue-in-cheek reference guide book featuring the Junior League
 The Help (2009) book and The Help (2011 film)—the film stars Emma Stone and Bryce Dallas Howard in the Junior League of Jackson, Mississippi
 The Devil in the Junior League—2006 novel written by a former Junior Leaguer originally set to star Jennifer Garner in the film version.
 The character Betty Draper in the TV series Mad Men is a member of the Junior League

References

External links 

 Association of Junior Leagues International
 New York Junior League
 Canadian Federation of Junior Leagues
 Junior League of London
 Junior League of the City of New York Survey of Significant Interiors, 1984-1985. Held by the Department of Drawings & Archives, Avery Architectural & Fine Arts Library, Columbia University.

 
1901 establishments in New York City
1901 establishments in the United States
Charities based in New York City
Children's charities based in the United States
High society (social class)
International women's organizations
Mutual organizations
Non-profit organizations based in New York City
Organizations established in 1901
Youth organizations established in the 1900s